Joseph Lawrence Kuharich (April 14, 1917 – January 25, 1981) was an American football player and coach. He served as the head football coach at the University of San Francisco from 1948 to 1951, and at the University of Notre Dame from 1959 to 1962, compiling a career college football record of 42–37.  Kuharich was also the head coach of the Chicago Cardinals in 1952, the Washington Redskins from 1954 to 1958, and the Philadelphia Eagles from 1964 to 1968, amassing a career coaching record of 58–81–3 in the National Football League (NFL).  He played football as a guard at Notre Dame from 1935 to 1937 and with the Chicago Cardinals in 1940, 1941 and 1945.  Kuharich's death was on the day the Eagles lost Super Bowl XV to the Oakland Raiders.

Early life and playing career
Kuharich was born April 14, 1917 in South Bend, Indiana. He played college football at the University of Notre Dame under coach Elmer Layden, who praised Kuharich as one of the best and smartest players he ever had. In his college career. Many recall Kuharich's greatest game as the stunning 'Fighting Irish comeback' over Ohio State in 1935. Kuharich was drafted by the Pittsburgh Pirates (NFL) in the 12th round of the 1938 NFL Draft.

Early coaching career
Kuharich began his coaching career as an assistant freshman coach at Notre Dame in 1938. In 1939, he coached at the Vincentian Institute in Albany. He then moved to the pro ranks as a player, playing guard for the Chicago Cardinals in 1940 and 1941. After serving in the Navy, he returned to the Cardinals in 1945, his last season as a player. In 1946, Kuharich served as line coach for the Pittsburgh Steelers and moved on to the University of San Francisco as head coach in 1948. His overall record for USF was 25–14, including an undefeated 9–0 season in 1951. Among his most prized pupils was Ollie Matson, who became a Pro Football Hall of Fame running back with the Chicago Cardinals. Matson's USF teammates also included future Pro Football Hall of Famers Gino Marchetti (Baltimore Colts) and Bob St. Clair (San Francisco 49ers). Burl Toler, defensive standout who suffered a career-ending knee injury in the College All-Star game, later became the NFL's first African-American official. The team's student publicity director, Pete Rozelle, served a distinguished career as Commissioner of the National Football League. No other team in college football history can boast as many players and contributors honored by the Pro Football Hall of Fame, as the 1951 USF Dons. Oddly, financial concerns led the school to disband football the following year. When Kuharich felt the time was right, he moved up to the National Football League, serving as head coach of the Chicago Cardinals in 1952, succeeding Curly Lambeau. In 1953, he served as a scout for several pro teams, then in 1954 became coach of the Washington Redskins, then owned by the controversial George Preston Marshall. Once again, Kuharich succeeded Lambeau. The Redskins claim to fame was diminutive Eddie LeBaron, the smallest quarterback in the league, who had the daunting task of succeeding the legendary Sammy Baugh. A successful campaign in 1955 landed Kuharich "Coach of the Year" honors, then hardships sent Kuharich's Redskins to a losing streak. After five seasons in Washington, Kuharich resigned when he received an offer from Notre Dame.

Notre Dame
Kuharich took the head coaching position at the University of Notre Dame in 1959. He had earlier been contacted with offers by Notre Dame after the 1956 season, after the Irish finished 2–8, but before he had a chance to accept an offer, Terry Brennan was given a reprieve. Kuharich compiled a 17–23 record over four non-winning seasons and remains to this day the only coach ever to have an overall losing record at Notre Dame. Included was a school-record eight-game losing streak in 1960, a year in which the Irish finished 2–8. It was one of the worst stretches in Notre Dame football history.  

It was widely speculated that Kuharich never made the adjustment from pro football to college football, attempting to use complicated pro coaching techniques with collegiate players. He never seemed to adapt to the limited substitution rules in effect at the time either, preferring clumsy linemen playing in positions where smaller and quicker players were favored. Despite his controversial and confusing tactics,  Kuharich seemed perfectly content finishing with a losing record every year. which did not sit well with Notre Dame fans. Kuharich resigned in the spring of 1963 and assumed the post of supervisor of NFL official. Due to Kuharich's sudden departure, Hugh Devore was named interim head coach while the search for a permanent replacement was sought. Despite his unsuccessful Notre Dame tenure, Kuharich remains the only Irish coach to post back-to-back shutouts over their greatest rival, the University of Southern California Trojans in 1960 (17-0) and 1961 (30-0).

Kuharich's name is commonly associated with a rule change still in effect today, known by some as the Kuharich defensive foul rule. In 1961, Notre Dame trailed Syracuse at home 14–15, with three seconds left to play. A desperation 56-yard field goal attempt by the Notre Dame fell short as time ran out, effectively ending the game. However, Syracuse were penalized 15 yards for roughing the placekick holder, and Notre Dame was given a second chance despite the clock running out. Kicker Joe Perkowski attempted a 41-yard field goal successfully, and Notre Dame won the game 17-15. Syracuse immediately cried foul, claiming that under the existing rules, the second kick should not have been allowed because time had expired. It was never clear whether the Irish victory was permitted to stand, but a rule was clarified to state that a half cannot end on an accepted defensive foul—consistent with the officials' ruling in this game.

Philadelphia Eagles
Kuharich returned to the NFL coaching ranks with the Philadelphia Eagles in 1964. The team had gone through an unsteady 1963, ending the season at 2-10-2, due in large part to injuries plaguing starting quarterback Sonny Jurgensen. Eagles' owner Jerry Wolman made Kuharich head coach and general manager. In return for quarterback Norm Snead and defensive back Jimmy Carr, Kuharich traded away Hall of Fame and perennial Pro-Bowlers Sonny Jurgensen and Tommy McDonald. Philadelphia also acquired Ollie Matson from the Detroit Lions. Despite the acquisitions, the Eagles continued posting losing records in 1964 of 6–8, and in 1965 of 5–9.

Kuharich's only winning season with the Eagles came in 1966, when the team went 9–5. Immediately following this season, Eagles' then-owner Jerry Wolman gave Kuharich an unprecedented, and unheard of, contract extension of 15 years. The winning 1966 season, in which the Eagles finished 2nd in the Eastern Conference, gave the team a date with the Baltimore Colts in the "Playoff Bowl", a postseason exhibition intended to draw fans and help coaches plan for the following season. In that "Playoff Bowl" of January 8, 1967 Kuharich became the first coach to wear a wireless microphone for NFL Films. Portions of his wiring and the Playoff Bowl itself, were used at the end of NFL Films' 1967 special They Call It Pro Football.

Following the 1966 season, the Eagles once again began a slide to mediocrity, posting a losing record of 6-7-1 in 1967. The 1968 season was Kuharich's last. The Eagles vied most of the season for pro football's worst record, which would have earned them the chance to draft Heisman Trophy winner O. J. Simpson No. 1 overall. But the Eagles won the twelfth and thirteenth games of the season, then a 14-game season, for a final record of 2-12-0, and the Buffalo Bills, with a record of 1-12-1, won the rights to Simpson. So despised by Eagles' fans by this time was Kuharich that a plane towing a banner reading "Joe Must Go" circled Franklin Field, the Eagles home field at that time, for all home games of the 1968 season, and for three of the home games a large banner was draped over the upper deck of Franklin Field which read simply "Joe Please Do Us a Favor and Die". This was the season of the game of legend in which Santa Claus was pelted with snowballs as he circled the track at Franklin Field at halftime of the final game of the season (December 15, 1968, a loss to the Minnesota Vikings, 24-17), precipitated as a result of the fans realizing that they would not be getting the No. 1 overall draft pick as they had hoped only three weeks earlier.

Three months after the 1969 NFL draft, financially distressed owner Jerry Wolman sold the Eagles on May 1, 1969 to trucking millionaire Leonard Tose. Tose and Kuharich agreed to a settlement on the remaining years of the ex-coach's $60,000 annual contract. In Kuharich's final draft, the Eagles selected a running back of (ultimately) marginal skills named Leroy Keyes, who ended up being just a spot player on the roster. He was cut in 1972, after only four seasons and was out of the league, and out of football altogether, after the following season. Kuharich's final record with the Eagles was 28-41-1, giving him a .407 winning percentage.

Personal life
Kuharich married Madelyn Eleanor Imholz on October 6, 1943.  They had two sons, Joseph Lawrence, Jr. (Lary) a former CFL and AFL head coach, and Bill who followed in his father's footsteps as the New Orleans Saints General Manager from 1996 to 2000, Director of Pro Personnel from 2000 to 2005 and Vice President of Player Personnel for the Kansas City Chiefs from 2006 to 2009.

Joe Kuharich died on January 25, 1981, the same day that the Eagles played in their first Super Bowl.

Head coaching record

College

NFL

References

External links
 

1917 births
1981 deaths
American football guards
Notre Dame Fighting Irish football coaches
Notre Dame Fighting Irish football players
San Francisco Dons football coaches
Chicago Cardinals players
Chicago Cardinals head coaches
Philadelphia Eagles head coaches
Pittsburgh Steelers coaches
Washington Redskins head coaches
Players of American football from South Bend, Indiana